Love and Other Hard Times is the sixth studio album by American country music singer Eddy Raven. It was released in 1985 by RCA Nashville.

Content and reception
Three singles from the album made the Hot Country Songs charts: "Operator, Operator", "I Wanna Hear It from You", and "You Should Have Been Gone by Now".

Cash Box reviewed the album positively, stating that it was "another exhibition of his fine vocal range and his valuable songwriting ability." Billboard also published a positive review of the album, which said that his "haunting and sincere voice is matched here by some of the best material he's recorded in recent years."

Track listing

Personnel
Eddie Bayers - drums
Barry Beckett - keyboards
Dennis Burnside - keyboards, synthesizer
Don Gant - background vocals
Sonny Garrish - steel guitar
David Innis - synthesizer
Frank J. Myers - acoustic guitar, electric guitar
Mark O'Connor - fiddle, mandolin
Joe Osborn - bass guitar
Eddy Raven - lead vocals
James Stroud - drums
Dennis Wilson - background vocals
Paul Worley - acoustic guitar, electric guitar
Reggie Young - electric guitar

Chart performance

References

1985 albums
RCA Records albums
Eddy Raven albums
Albums produced by Paul Worley